Bulbophyllum grandiflorum is a species of orchid found in the Solomon Islands and Papua New Guinea.

References

External links

grandiflorum
Taxa named by Carl Ludwig Blume